Ratu Meli Semisi Naevo Saukawa (born 3 May 1975 in Nawaka, Nadi) is a Fijian rugby union player.  He plays as a flanker. His nickname is Man Mountain. His father, Joeli Lesavua, and two brothers, Apenisa and Manoa Naevo, are also Fiji reps.

Career
He plays sevens for Fiji. He is a strong tackler with good line-out skills, he also has the speed for sevens. His ball-hunting skills earned him his first cap in the 2006 Pacific 5 Nations tournament where he stalked the Samoans from the side of the scrum to help Fiji win 23–20. He has made an excellent name for himself in the Fiji sevens team with outstanding performances in his first outing in Argentina and Wellington, 2002. He is a member of the 2005 Rugby World Cup Sevens team, his speed and aerial skills made him a menace. He was bestowed with the captaincy role for the last two tournaments of the 2005–06 IRB 7s Series, and it was fitting that he lifted the London Sevens trophy and also the IRB sevens trophy.

Commonwealth Games
He was also part of the 2002 Commonwealth Games in Manchester where Fiji won the silver medal when they were defeated by New Zealand in the final after Fiji were reduced to 5 men for most of the game.

Semisi was also part of the 2006 Commonwealth Games where they won a bronze medal.

2007 RWC
Naevo was also part of the Fiji 15's team that reached the Quarter-finals of the Rugby Union World Cup in 2007.

References

External links
 
 

1976 births
Living people
Sportspeople from Nadi
Fijian rugby union players
Rugby union flankers
Fiji international rugby union players
Pacific Islanders rugby union players
Commonwealth Games silver medallists for Fiji
Commonwealth Games bronze medallists for Fiji
Rugby sevens players at the 2002 Commonwealth Games
Male rugby sevens players
Rugby sevens players at the 2006 Commonwealth Games
Fijian expatriate rugby union players
Expatriate rugby union players in New Zealand
Expatriate rugby union players in Japan
Fijian expatriate sportspeople in New Zealand
Fijian expatriate sportspeople in Japan
Green Rockets Tokatsu players
Counties Manukau rugby union players
Fiji international rugby sevens players
I-Taukei Fijian people
Commonwealth Games medallists in rugby sevens
Commonwealth Games rugby sevens players of Fiji
Medallists at the 2006 Commonwealth Games